Daniel Lewis Arnold (born March 15, 1995) is an American football tight end for the Jacksonville Jaguars of the National Football League (NFL). He played college football and track at Wisconsin-Platteville.

Early life
Arnold was born in Milwaukee, Wisconsin and raised in Janesville, Wisconsin, but attended school in Rockford, Illinois as his mother was a teacher at Boylan Catholic High School. He attended Boylan Catholic for three years before his family moved to North Dakota. He then attended Shanley High School in Fargo, North Dakota. Arnold attended college at University of Wisconsin-Platteville where he competed in the 110m hurdles. Arnold came second in the Division 3 110m hurdle championship, where he ran faster than Conor Murtagh, who finished in 3rd and Jacek Pikul who finished 6th.

Professional career

New Orleans Saints
Arnold went undrafted in the 2017 NFL Draft, but received invitations to attend rookie minicamp and tryout for the Kansas City Chiefs and New Orleans Saints. On June 5, 2017, the Saints signed Arnold to a three-year, $1.66 million contract.

On June 16, 2017, the Saints placed Arnold on injured reserve due to an unspecified injury. Arnold was initially waived/injured, but was placed on injured reserve after clearing waivers.

On July 26, 2018, it was reported that the New Orleans Saints' coaching staff had elected to move Arnold from wide receiver to tight end. Arnold was moved in order for him to have a better chance of making the roster. The move was partly due to the release of tight end Coby Fleener, leaving the a lack of depth at the position. Assistant head coach/tight ends coach Dan Campbell oversaw Arnold's transition to tight end and Arnold credits him with his success at tight end.

Throughout training camp, Arnold competed to be the third tight end on the depth chart against Michael Hoomanawanui, John Phillips, Garrett Griffin, and Deon Yelder. Arnold impressed the coaches with his ability during training camp and made the active 53-man roster. Head coach Sean Payton named Arnold the third tight end on the Saints' depth chart to begin the regular season, behind veterans Benjamin Watson and Josh Hill.

Arnold was inactive for the first four regular season games (Weeks 1–4) as a healthy scratch. On October 8, 2018, he made his NFL debut during the Saints’ 43–19 win against the Washington Redskins in Week 5. In Week 7, he made his first career reception, a ten-yard reception from Saints’ quarterback Drew Brees during the second quarter of a 24–23 win at the Baltimore Ravens. He finished the game with two receptions for 35 yards. On November 11, 2018, Arnold earned his first career start and made two receptions for 25 yards as the Saints defeated the Cincinnati Bengals 51–14 in Week 10. On November 22, 2018, Arnold scored his first touchdown against the Atlanta Falcons on a 25-yard reception.

On August 31, 2019, Arnold was waived by the Saints and was signed to the practice squad the next day. He was promoted to the active roster on October 19, 2019. On December 4, 2019, Arnold was waived by the Saints.

Arizona Cardinals
On December 5, 2019, Arnold was claimed off waivers by the Arizona Cardinals.

In Week 13 of the 2020 season against the Los Angeles Rams, Arnold recorded two catches for 61 yards that both resulted in touchdowns during the 38–28 loss.

Carolina Panthers
On March 19, 2021, Arnold signed a two-year contract with the Carolina Panthers. Through his first three games of the season, Arnold caught 7 passes for 84 yards.

Jacksonville Jaguars
On September 27, 2021, Arnold was traded to the Jacksonville Jaguars along with a 2022 third-round pick in exchange for cornerback C. J. Henderson and a 2022 fifth-round pick. He suffered a sprained MCL in Week 12 and was placed on injured reserve on November 30, 2021.

References

External links
Arizona Cardinals bio
Wisconsin–Platteville Pioneers bio

1995 births
Living people
Players of American football from Wisconsin
Sportspeople from Janesville, Wisconsin
American football tight ends
Wisconsin–Platteville Pioneers football players
Arizona Cardinals players
New Orleans Saints players
Carolina Panthers players
Jacksonville Jaguars players